Elections were held in the organized municipalities in the Timiskaming District of Ontario on October 25, 2010 in conjunction with municipal elections across the province. An X beside a candidate indicates the candidate is the incumbent.

Across the region, Doug Shearer and Bill Brookfield were elected as school trustees on District School Board Ontario North East, Martin Drainville, Rick Brassard and Steve Malciw were elected to the Northeastern Catholic District School Board and Roger Brazeau was elected to the Conseil scolaire de district du Nord-Est de l'Ontario.

Armstrong
Incumbent reeve Jules Gravel was acclaimed in Armstrong. Robert Éthier, Jean-Marc Boileau, Georges Daviau and Dominique Nackers were elected to council.

Brethour
Arla West was acclaimed in Brethour. Brad Noyes, Russell Britton, Kieven Bennewies and Julie Wilkinson were elected to council.

Casey
Incumbent reeve Guy Labonte was acclaimed back into office in Casey. Marc Robillard, Jacques Fortin, Janet Little and Suzanne Boucher were elected to council.

Chamberlain
Incumbent reeve Bill Dickinson was acclaimed back into office in Chamberlain. Richard Pollock, Shirley Blackburn, Robert Blackburn and Peter Ruel were elected to council.

Charlton and Dack
Wayne Pawson defeated incumbent reeve Reta Allan in Charlton and Dack. Debbie Veerman, Merrill Bond, William Laurila and James Bott were elected to council.

Cobalt
Tina Sartoretto was elected mayor of Cobalt. Sue Nielsen, George Othmer, Gino Chitaroni, Mike Harrison, Garry Bigelow and Pat Anderson were elected to council.

Coleman
Dan Cleroux defeated incumbent mayor Colleen Belanger in Coleman. Lois Perry, Pat Tressider, Susan Côté and Cathy Marcella were elected to council.

Englehart
Incumbent mayor Nina Wallace was acclaimed back into office in Englehart. Pauline Brassard, Douglas Metson, Dianne Peplinski, Twyla Wilson, Annette Wood-Wheeldon and Steph Palmateer were elected to council.

Evanturel
Jack Briggs was acclaimed in Evanturel. John Simmons, Kandase Robertson, Derek Mundle and Cindy Kirkbride were elected to council.

Gauthier

Harley
Gerald Roy will be the reeve of Harley. Auldin Bilow, Pauline Archambault, Clifford Fielder and Richard McNaughton will serve on council.

Harris
Martin Auger was acclaimed in Harris. Wilda Gibson, Wayne Jelly, Peter Gibson and Alan Licop will serve on council.

Hilliard
Morgan Carson will be the reeve of Hilliard. Dan Wark, Bruce Posch, Maurice Laframboise and Erwin Hirschbeck will serve on council.

Hudson
Larry Craig was acclaimed in Hudson. Dan Morrow, Bryan McNair, Greg Seed and Martin Jarvis will serve on council.

James
Incumbent reeve Terry Fiset was acclaimed in James. Henry Baker, David Mullin, Bruce McShane and Janet MacDowall will serve on council.

Kerns
Terry Phillips will serve as reeve of Kerns. Mark Lenover, Carter Seymour, Stephen Aitchison and Dennis Jib will serve on council.

Kirkland Lake
Incumbent mayor Bill Enouy was re-elected in Kirkland Lake. Tony Antoniazzi, Normand Mino, Todd Morgan, Allan French, Jean-Guy Chamaillard and Tom Barker were elected to council.

Larder Lake
Patricia Bodick was elected mayor of Larder Lake. Louise Valyear, Paul Kelly, Rickey Vachon and David Larocque were elected to council.

Latchford
George Lefebvre defeated incumbent mayor Peter Davies in Latchford. Larry Anderson, Maxine Cannon, Theo Cull, Scott Green, Jo-Anne Cartner and Dave Willcock will serve on council.

Matachewan
Incumbent reeve Bev Hine was re-elected in Matachewan. Joseph Bisson, Nelson Costello, Cheryl Drummond and Guy Dube were elected to council.

McGarry

Incumbent reeve Clermont Lapointe was re-elected in McGarry. Bonita Culhane, Matt Reimer, Elaine Fic and Jean-Yves Godin were elected to council.

Temiskaming Shores
Judy Pace, the incumbent mayor of Temiskaming Shores, did not run for re-election. The election was won by Carman Kidd, a former reeve of Dymond Township prior to the municipal amalgamation of 2004. Doug Jelly, Mike McArthur, Bryan Thornton, Danny Whalen, Bob Hobbs and Jamie Morrow were elected to council.

Thornloe
Roy Vottero will serve as reeve of Thornloe. Pauline Charland, Allan Peddie, Pauline Peddie and Earl Reed will serve on council.

References

2010 Ontario municipal elections
Timiskaming District